Julia Blackburn (born 1948) is a British author of both fiction and non-fiction. She is the daughter of poet Thomas Blackburn and artist Rosalie de Meric.

Julia Blackburn's bohemian and troubled upbringing is the subject of her memoir The Three of Us (2008).

Awards and honours
1996 Orange Prize, shortlist, The Book of Colour
1999 Orange Prize, shortlist, The Leper's Companions
1999 James Tait Black Memorial Prize (Best Novel), nominee, The Leper's Companions
2009 J.R. Ackerley Award, winner, The Three of Us
2011 Costa Book Awards (Biography), shortlist, Thin Paths: Journeys in and Around an Italian Mountain Village
2012 Dolman Best Travel Book Award, shortlist, Thin Paths: Journeys in and around an Italian Mountain Village
2019 Wainwright Prize, shortlist, Time Song: Searching for Doggerland

Bibliography

Novels
 The Book of Colour (1995) 
 The Leper's Companions (1999)

Non-fiction
 The White Men: The First Response of Aboriginal Peoples to the White Man (1979)
 Charles Waterton, 1782–1865: Conservationist and Traveller (1991)
 Daisy Bates in the Desert: A Woman's Life Among the Aborigines (1994)
 The Emperor's Last Island: Journey to St.Helena (2000)
 Old Man Goya (2002)
 With Billie: A New Look at the Unforgettable Lady Day (2005), Vintage,  – includes material from interviews conducted by Linda Lipnack Kuehl
 My Animals and Other Family (2007)
 The Three of Us: A Family Story (2008)
 Thin Paths: Journeys in and Around an Italian Mountain Village (2011)
 Threads: The Delicate Life of John Craske (2015)
 Time Song: Searching for Doggerland (2019); in the US: Time Song: Journeys in Search of a Submerged Land (2019)

References

External links
 Author's official website

1948 births
Living people
British women novelists
20th-century British novelists
21st-century British novelists
20th-century British women writers
English people of Mauritian descent
Fellows of the Royal Society of Literature
21st-century British women writers